The 2015 FIBA Europe Under-20 Championship Division B was the 11th edition of the Division B of the FIBA Europe Under-20 Championship, the second-tier level of the European Under-20 basketball championship. The tournament was played in Székesfehérvár, Hungary, from 9 to 19 July 2015.

Participating teams

  (20th place, 2014 FIBA Europe Under-20 Championship Division A)

  (18th place, 2014 FIBA Europe Under-20 Championship Division A)

  (19th place, 2014 FIBA Europe Under-20 Championship Division A)

First round
In this round, the eighteen teams were allocated in two groups of five teams and two groups of four teams. The top two teams in each group advanced to the Second round. The other teams played in the Classification Games.

Group A

Group B

Group C

Group D

Second round

Group E

Group F

Classification groups for 9th – 18th places

Group G

Group H

5th – 8th place playoffs

Semifinals

Final classification games

Match for 17th place

Match for 15th place

Match for 13th place

Match for 11th place

Match for 9th place

Match for 7th place

Match for 5th place

Bronze medal game

Final

Final standings

References

External links 
FIBA official website

FIBA U20 European Championship Division B
2015–16 in European basketball
2015–16 in Hungarian basketball
International youth basketball competitions hosted by Hungary
July 2015 sports events in Europe